Wilson Staff is the golf products division of Wilson Sporting Goods. Wilson designs and manufactures a full range of golf equipment, accessories, and apparel using the Wilson Staff, Wilson, ProStaff, Profile, Ultra and Hope brands. Wilson's other lines are generally considered to be "big box," "value," or "economy" brands, while the Wilson Staff line provides higher quality equipment used on all major professional golf tours.

Products marketed under the Wilson Staff brand include golf equipment (balls, clubs, gloves, and bags), and clothing (polo shirts).

Many of the world's top professional golfers have used Wilson equipment, including Gene Sarazen (who had a 75-year relationship with the company, the longest-running contract in sports history). Other golfers who have used Wilson Staff equipment include Sam Snead, Walter Hagen, Arnold Palmer, Patty Berg, Nick Faldo, Payne Stewart, John Daly, Ben Crenshaw, and Vijay Singh. Palmer and Crenshaw both used Wilson 8802 putters, with Crenshaw's receiving the moniker Little Ben due to his proficiency with it. Current Wilson Staff players include Open and USPGA champion Pádraig Harrington and Kevin Streelman.

History 

In 1932 Wilson Advisory staff member Gene Sarazen was inspired by the aerodynamics of an airplane's wing to create a club head that would glide smoothly through sand. Sarazen welded a piece of steel to the sole of the club and ground it producing 'bounce'. This marked the introduction of the sand wedge and in 1933 alone, Wilson sold 50,000 of these clubs, marketed as the R-90, which went on to be the most popular sand wedge in golf.

In 1933 Wilson Advisory Staff member Willie Ogg created a design for distributing weight away from the heel of the club head, moving it towards the "sweet spot" of the blade. This design feature was used in the Wilson  irons, the forerunner of perimeter weighted  or cavity back irons.

In 1948, then Wilson Sporting Goods President Lawrence Icely provided the financial backing for Patty Berg and Babe Didrikson Zaharias to form the Women’s PGA, predecessor of today's LPGA.

In 1954 Wilson began producing the Wilson Staff ball which was seen as revolutionary due to its ability to launch up to 40 percent faster than the golf club's head speed. In 2005 Wilson Staff claims to be the first golf company to utilize nanotechnology in golf equipment.

Major championships
Wilson Staff claims that its line of irons has "more majors won than any other brand." Players using Wilson Staff clubs have won a total of 62 majors.

Sponsorship deals
In the past, Wilson has had many of the world best golfers under contract, including six-time major winner Nick Faldo and three-time major winner Pádraig Harrington. Wilson Staff currently has endorsement deals with many professional golfers who compete on all the major tours.

References

External links

 

Wilson Sporting Goods
Golf equipment manufacturers
1914 establishments in Illinois